The Korea Maritime Institute (KMI) is a think tank and research center developing South Korean policies on marine affairs and fisheries, operated by the South Korean government through the Office of Government Policy Coordination.  KMI was established under its current name in 1997, though expanded from a research center created in 1984 specializing in shipping economics.

KMI is organized into five research divisions as of 2011:
Marine & Coastal Policy Research Department
Shipping, Port & Logistics Research Department
Fisheries Policy Research Department
Marine Territory and Industry Research Department
Fisheries Outlook Center

and has two overseas centers:
Shanghai Research Center
Korea-US Marine Policy Joint Research Center, at the University of Rhode Island

KMI is headquartered in Mapo-gu, Seoul, having a staff of about 180.

See also
Fishing industry of South Korea

References

External links
Korea Maritime Institute (English)

Organizations based in Seoul
Research institutes in South Korea
Fishing in South Korea
Government agencies of South Korea
Fisheries and aquaculture research institutes
Maritime organizations